Osei Kyei Mensah Bonsu (previously known as Lawrence Addae and born on 3 February 1957) is a Ghanaian urban planner and politician. He is currently the majority leader in the Ghanaian Parliament and also the  Minister Designate for Parliamentary Affairs in Ghana.

Early life and education 
Osei was born on 3 February 1957. He hails from Bremang-Afrancho, a town in Kumasi, Ashanti Region. In 1982, he graduated from the Kwame Nkrumah University of Science and Technology with a Bachelor of Science degree in Urban Planning.

Political career 
Osei is a member of the New Patriotic Party. He first became a Member of the Parliament in January 1997. He has kept his seat since then, representing his constituency in the 2nd, 3rd, 4th, 5th, 6th and 7th Parliament of the 4th Republic of Ghana. He is the chairperson for the Special Budget, House, and Business Committees. He is also a member of the Finance, Mines and Energy, Standing Orders, and Selection Committees.

Elections

1996 Parliamentary Elections 

Osei was first elected into Parliament during the 1996 Ghanaian General Elections on the Ticket of the New Patriotic Party  representing the Suame Constituency in the Ashanti Region of Ghana. He polled 47,455 votes out of the 64,394 valid votes cast representing 57.40% against Paul Yeboah an NDC member who polled 10,828 votes, Azong Alhassan a PNC member who polled 3,219 votes and Habiba Atta a CPP member who polled 2,892 votes.

2004 Parliamentary Elections 
Osei was elected as the member of parliament for the Suame constituency of the Ashanti Region of Ghana in the 2004 Ghanaian general elections. He won on the ticket of the New Patriotic Party. His constituency was a part of the 36 parliamentary seats out of 39 seats won by the New Patriotic Party in that election for the Ashanti Region. The New Patriotic Party won a majority total of 128 parliamentary seats out of 230 seats.  He was elected with 48,500 votes out of 59,039 total valid votes cast. This was equivalent to 82.1% of total valid votes cast. He was elected over Agonno Sampson Young of the People's National Convention, Paul Richard Kofi Yeboah of the National Democratic Congress and Frederick Antwi of the Convention People's Party. These obtained 934, 8,448 and 1,157 votes respectively of total valid votes cast. These were equivalent to 1.6%, 14.3% and 2% respectively of total valid votes cast.

2008 Parliamentary Elections 
In 2008, he won the general elections on the ticket of the New Patriotic Party for the same constituency. His constituency was part of the 34 parliamentary seats out of 39 seats won by the New Patriotic Party in that election for the Ashanti Region. The New Patriotic Party won a minority total of 109 parliamentary seats out of 230 seats. He was elected with 45,235 votes out of 57,765 total valid votes cast. This was  equivalent to 78.31% of total valid votes cast. He was elected over David Osei Manu of the National Democratic Congress, Ameyaw Aboagye Peter of Democratic People's Party and Frederick Antwi-Nsiah of the Convention People's Party. These obtained 9,742, 2,409 and 379 votes respectively of the total valid votes cast. These were equivalent to 37.59%, 5.43% and 1.28% respectively of the total votes cast.

2012 Parliamentary Elections 
In 2012, he won the general elections on the ticket of the New Patriotic Party for the same constituency.  He was elected with 60,829 votes out of 76,852 total valid votes cast. This was equivalent to 79.15% of total valid votes cast. He was elected over Alidu Baba Dambasea of the National Democratic Congress, Solomon Nkrumah Appia Kubi of the Progressive People's Party, Adam Mohammed of the People's National Convention, Frederick Antwi-Nsiah of the Convention People's Party, Mavis Afriyie of the Democratic People's Party,  Abena Nyarko of the National Democratic Party, Osei-Bempah Hayford and Paul Richard Kofi Yeboah both independent candidates. These obtained 10,589, 434, 376, 220, 71, 194, 3,752 and 387 votes respectively of the total valid votes cast. These were equivalent to 13.78%, 0.56%, 0.49%, 0.29%, 0.09%, 0.25%, 4.88% and 0.50% respectively of the total votes cast. Whilst his party was in opposition he served as the minority leader of the Ghanaian parliament from 2013 to 2017.

2020 Parliamentary Elections 
He again contested  the 2020 Ghanaian general election as the parliamentary candidate for the New Patriotic Party. Hon. Osei Kyei Mensah Bonsu contested with four other which includes Dodoovi Francis of the National Democratic Congress , the Convention People's Party Sulemana Mohammed, All People Congress, Mohammed Mubarak and the Independent candidate. At the end of the polls,  the Incumbent Member of Parliament for Suame,  Hon. Osei Kyei Mensah Bonsu won the seat again for the New Patriotic Party NPP with 67,095 votes representing 76.1%, the National Democratic Congress NDC candidate Dodoovi Francis gathered 9,312 votes representing 10.6% of total valid  votes cast. While the Convention People's Party Sulemana Mohammed manage with 299 votes which means he gathered 0.3% of the total valid votes cast. All People Congress also had 213 votes making 0.2% of the total vote cast. Finally the Independent candidate George Prempeh also came second with 11,217 votes making 12.7%of the total vote cast.

Commonwealth Parliamentary Association (CPA) Elections 
Osei Kyei-Mensah-Bonsu, was elected by the Executive Committee of the Commonwealth Parliamentary Association (CPA) as its new acting Vice-Chairperson. Osei Kyei-Mensah-Bonsu was handed the top job after a successful election that saw him beat New Zealand’s Garry Brownlee, his only contender.

Suggested naming rights
Prior to the completion of the Parliament's Job 600 building,  Mensah Bonsu proposed the renaming of the main Job 600 building. He suggested the building be named after the first speaker of Ghana's fourth parliament, Justice D. F. Annan, to honour the contribution he made towards the development of parliamentary affairs and democracy in Ghana. He also proposed that one of the two new blocks built behind the main Job 600 be named after Peter Ala Adjetey, who succeeded Justice Annan. Opposition to these naming issues was led by members of the Convention People's Party, who believed renaming Job 600 would erase the contributions of Kwame Nkrumah from Ghanaian history.

Personal life 
Osei is married with eight children. He is a Christian who worships at the Assemblies of God Church

References

Living people
1957 births
Ghanaian MPs 2013–2017
New Patriotic Party politicians
Ghanaian MPs 2009–2013
Ghanaian MPs 2005–2009
Ghanaian MPs 2001–2005
Ghanaian MPs 1997–2001
Kwame Nkrumah University of Science and Technology alumni
People from Ashanti Region
Ghanaian Christians
St. Peter's Boys Senior High School alumni